Csaba Pintér (born January 11, 1967) is the bass player of Hungarian heavy metal band Pokolgép since 1996.

External links
 Data page on Pokolgép's site

1967 births
Living people
Hungarian bass guitarists
Male bass guitarists
Heavy metal bass guitarists